A La Mar is the second studio album by Dominican musician Vicente García, released on August 26, 2016.

Background and accolades
The album marks García's first collaboration with Calle 13 producer Visitante. The collaboration inspired García to deviate from mainstream bachata and incorporate a variety of genres into the album: the artist recalled, "I [didn't] want to be that guy that just does Caribbean music". García won three awards including Best New Artist at the 2017 Latin Grammy Awards. The song "Bachata en Kingston" from A La Mar won Best Tropical Song at the ceremony. A La Mar was ranked by the Los Angeles Times as the best album of the decade by any Dominican artist.

Track listing

References

Latin pop albums by Dominican Republic artists